The 36th Annual Nickelodeon Kids' Choice Awards ceremony was held on March 4, 2023, at the Microsoft Theater in Los Angeles, California with Nate Burleson and Charli D'Amelio serving as hosts. It aired live on Nickelodeon and in a domestic simulcast with several other Paramount Global cable networks, and was broadcast live or tape delayed across all of Nickelodeon's international networks. Prior to the ceremony, a nominations special aired on Nickelodeon on March 2.

The ceremony had performances from Bebe Rexha, Young Dylan, and Lil Baby.

The Nickelodeon network premiere of Sing led into the ceremony, while a linear premiere of an episode of Big Nate served as the lead-out.

Appearances 
Prior to the ceremony, Pressley Hosbach, DangMattSmith, and Jane McManus hosted an Orange Carpet livestream on the Nickelodeon YouTube channel.

The ceremony featured appearances by celebrities including Awkwafina, Halle Bailey, Bianca Belair, Big E, Dove Cameron, Miranda Cosgrove, Pete Davidson, Dominique Fishback, Montez Ford, Dwayne Johnson, Michael Le, Lil Uzi Vert, Peyton List, Becky Lynch, Melissa McCarthy, MrBeast, Jenna Ortega, Chris Pine, Bella Poarch, Anthony Ramos, Olivia Rodrigo, Michelle Rodriguez, Seth Rogen, Kelly Rowland, Adam Sandler, Lilly Singh, That Girl Lay Lay, Pierson Wodzynski, and Xavier Woods.

Performers

Winners and nominees 
The nominees were announced and voting opened on January 31, 2023. Voting ended on March 4, 2023. The winners are listed first, highlighted in boldfaced text.

Movies

Television

Music

Sports

Miscellaneous

Special Recognitions

Lifetime Achievement Award 
 Optimus Prime

King of Comedy 
 Adam Sandler

International 
The following are nominations for awards to be given by Nickelodeon's international networks.

Notes

References

External links 
  (archived)
 

Kids' Choice
Kids' Choice Awards
Kids' Choice Awards
Kids' Choice Awards
Nickelodeon Kids' Choice Awards